The Hun shrew (Crocidura attila) is a species of mammal in the family Soricidae. It is found in Cameroon, Central African Republic, Mali, Democratic Republic of the Congo, and Nigeria. Its natural habitats are tropical or subtropical moist lowland or montane forest, and heavily degraded former forest.

References

Crocidura
Mammals described in 1915
Taxonomy articles created by Polbot